Starmarie (スターマリー, stylized as STARMARIE) are a Japanese Idol Group consisting of Nozomi Kishita, Shino Takamori, Monya Nakane, Hiroka Matsuzaki and Kaede Watanabe. Formed in July 2008 as a three-member idol group under M-SMILE, they have since become a five-member group. The group is famous for performing theme music for anime such as Cardfight!! Vanguard G and Onigiri.

History 
Starmarie was formed in July 2008 as a three-member group with Kaori Arai, Saya Sekine and Shiori Aoki as the original members. Nozomi Kishita joined as the fourth member in August of the same year while Shino Takamori joined after the graduation of Kaori Arai.

In February 2009, they released their first single, Time Machine Love (タイムマシーン・ラブ).

In March 2014, the group performed as part of the Japan Nite event at SXSW. In June 2014, three new members, Motoko Nakane, Hiroka Matsuzaki, and Kaede Watanabe joined the group. Their song "Mekurumeku Yūki" was used as the fourth ending theme to the anime series Cardfight!! Vanguard G.

On December 4, 2016, the group, with  AKB48's Team 8, performed on the 60 Years of Philippines-Japan Friendship celebration at the Market! Market! Activity Center in Taguig City, Philippines.

During their Asia Tour held at TSUTAYA O-EAST held on June 22, 2015, Nozomi Kishita declared their goal of performing in Budokan which has a seating capacity of 14,471, making this a big challenge for the group. In December 2016, August 2017, and February 2018, Starmarie held concerts in Nakano Sunplaza, which has a seating capacity of 2,222. Their song "Natsuninare!" is used as the fourth ending theme to the anime series Cardfight!! Vanguard G NEXT.

On September 3, 2020, Nozomi Kishita tested positive for COVID-19. She recovered on September 18.

On October 12, 2020, Kaede Watanabe announced her graduation.

Members

Current

Former

Discography

Albums

Mini albums

Best-of Albums

Singles

References

External links 
 STARMARIE Official Website

Japanese pop music groups
Japanese girl groups
Japanese idol groups
Musical groups established in 2008
2008 establishments in Japan
Musical groups from Tokyo